Raja Muhammad Haidar Khan (died 20 April 1966) was an Azad Kashmiri politician who served as interim President of Azad Kashmir from 18 May to 21 June 1952.

References

Presidents of Azad Kashmir
1966 deaths